Joanne Dru (born Joan Letitia LaCock; January 31, 1922 – September 10, 1996) was an American film and television actress, known for such films as Red River, She Wore a Yellow Ribbon, All the King's Men, and Wagon Master.

Career
Born in Logan, West Virginia, Dru moved to New York City in 1940 at the age of eighteen. After finding employment as a model, she was chosen by Al Jolson to appear in the cast of his Broadway show Hold On to Your Hats. When she moved to Hollywood, she found work in the theater. Dru was spotted by a talent scout and made her first film appearance in Abie's Irish Rose (1946). Over the next decade, Dru appeared frequently in films and on television. She was often cast in western films such as Howard Hawks's Red River (1948), John Ford's She Wore a Yellow Ribbon (1949), and Wagon Master (1950).

She gave a well-received performance in the dramatic film All the King's Men (1949), which went on to win the Academy Award for Best Picture, played a college graduate turned gangster's unhappy moll opposite Edmund O'Brien in the crime noir 711 Ocean Drive (1950), and co-starred with Dan Dailey in The Pride of St. Louis (1952), about major-league baseball pitcher Jerome "Dizzy" Dean. She appeared in the James Stewart drama Thunder Bay in 1953 and then the Martin and Lewis comedy 3 Ring Circus (1954). Her film career petered out by the end of the 1950s, but she continued working frequently in television, most notably as Babs Hooten on the 1960–61 ABC sitcom, Guestward, Ho!.

After Guestward, Ho!, she appeared sporadically for the rest of the 1960s and the first half of the 1970s, with one feature film appearance, in Sylvia (1965), and eight television appearances.

For her contribution to the television industry, Dru was awarded a star on the Hollywood Walk of Fame.

Personal life
She was the elder sister of Peter Marshall, an actor and singer best known as the original host of the American game show Hollywood Squares. Dru married popular vocalist and actor Dick Haymes in 1941. The couple had three children. Divorced from Haymes in 1949, Dru married Red River and All the King's Men co-star John Ireland less than a month later. The pair divorced in 1957. She had no children from her marriage to Ireland, or subsequent two marriages.

She was a staunch Republican, supporting Barry Goldwater in the 1964 United States presidential election
and appeared at a 1968 GOP cocktail party fundraiser for Richard Nixon.

Death
Dru died in Los Angeles, California on September 10, 1996, aged 74, from a respiratory ailment that developed from lymphedema, a result of chemotherapy she had received over her lifetime, according to her brother. Her ashes were scattered into the Pacific Ocean.

Selected filmography

 Abie's Irish Rose (1946) – Rosemary Murphy Levy
 Red River (1948) – Tess Millay
 She Wore a Yellow Ribbon (1949) – Olivia Dandridge
 All the King's Men (1949) – Anne Stanton
 Wagon Master (1950) – Denver
 711 Ocean Drive (1950) – Gail Mason
 Vengeance Valley (1951) – Jen Strobie
 Mr. Belvedere Rings the Bell (1951) – Miss Harriet Tripp
 Return of the Texan (1952) – Ann Marshall
 The Pride of St. Louis (1952) – Patricia Nash Dean
 My Pal Gus (1952) – Lydia Marble
 Thunder Bay (1953) – Stella Rigaud
 Hannah Lee (1953) – Hannah Lee (Hallie McLaird)
 Forbidden (1953) – Christine Lawrence Manard
 Duffy of San Quentin (1954) – Anne Halsey
 Southwest Passage (1954) – Lilly
 Siege at Red River (1954) – Nora Curtis
 3 Ring Circus (1954) – Jill Brent
 Day of Triumph (1954) – Mary Magdalene
 The Dark Avenger (1955) – Lady Joan Holland
 Sincerely Yours (1955) – Marion Moore
 Hell on Frisco Bay (1956) – Marcia Rollins
 Drango (1957) – Kate Calder
 The Light in the Forest (1958) – Milly Elder
 The Wild and the Innocent (1959) – Marcy
 September Storm (1960) – Anne Traymore
 Sylvia (1965) – Jane (Bronson) Phillips
 Super Fuzz (Poliziotto superpiù) (1980) – Rosy Labouche (final film role)

Radio appearances

References

Further reading

External links

 
 
 
 

1922 births
1996 deaths
20th-century American actresses
Actresses from West Virginia
American film actresses
American television actresses
California Republicans
Deaths from edema
Actors from Huntington, West Virginia
People from Logan, West Virginia
People from Los Angeles
Virginia Republicans
Western (genre) film actresses